The Federal Party of Manipur (FPM) was a political party in the Indian state of Manipur founded by Gangmumei Kamei in 1993.

Prior to the 2007 9th Legislative Assembly election the FPM, along with the Democratic Revolutionary People's Party, merged into the Manipur People's Party.

Election results

References

Political parties in Manipur
Political parties established in 1993
1993 establishments in Manipur